San Lucas Military Airstrip  is the military dirt airstrip located at Military Camp Number 40-C, located in San Lucas, 5 km South of Santa Rosalía, Municipality of Mulegé, Baja California Sur, Mexico, just on the Gulf of California coast. This military camp is the base of the 16th Infantry Company, that depends from the 40th Military Zone based in Guerrero Negro, BCS. The airstrip is handled by the Mexican Army and is used solely for military aviation purposes.

Airports in Baja California Sur
Military installations of Mexico